The 1999 Nigerian Senate election in Federal Capital Territory was held on February 20, 1999, to elect member of the Nigerian Senate to represent Federal Capital Territory. Khairat Abdulrazaq-Gwadabe representing FCT Senatorial District won on the platform of the Peoples Democratic Party.

Overview

Summary

Results

FCT Senatorial District 
The election was won by Khairat Abdulrazaq-Gwadabe of the Peoples Democratic Party.

References 

Federal Capital Territory Senate elections
February 1999 events in Nigeria
Fed
Federal Capital Territory (Nigeria) elections